The discography of Welsh rock and roll singer Shakin' Stevens consists of twenty studio albums, 23 compilation albums, sixty-nine singles, three box sets, five video albums and thirty-seven music videos.  Although the singer enjoyed his greatest period of success throughout the 1980s while recording for Epic Records, during the 1970s he was the lead vocalist for Shakin' Stevens and the Sunsets and had records issued by a variety of labels including Parlophone, CBS and Polydor in the UK and Pink Elephant and Dynamite in Europe.

Shakin' Stevens had his first entry in the UK Singles Chart with "Hot Dog" in 1980 and has had a total of thirty-three UK Top 40 hits, including four number one singles, and during the 1980s spent more weeks in the UK Singles Chart than any other artist. He also achieved number one singles in Ireland, Australia, Sweden, Austria, Norway, Switzerland and Poland as well as placing three albums in the Top 3 of the UK Albums Chart.  Despite only a handful of new releases since the early 1990s, the advent of the digital download age has ensured an annual return to the UK Singles Chart for Stevens thanks to the enduring popularity of his seasonal hit "Merry Christmas Everyone".

A number of Shakin' Stevens releases were not issued in his native UK.  Where this is the case, the original country of release (although not necessarily the sole country) is indicated in parentheses. However many of these have since seen UK issue, most notably in the 2020 "Fire In The Blood" box set.

Albums

Studio albums

Compilation albums

Non-UK compilation albums

Re-issues

Box sets

EPs

Singles

Videos

Video albums

Music videos

Notes

A.  Credited to Shakin' Stevens and the Sunsets.
B.  The Marie, Marie album was re-named and re-issued as This Ole House with the title song replacing one of the original tracks.
C.  The North American You Drive Me Crazy album bears no relation to the Japanese release of the same name.
D.  Re-issue of Come on Memphis! with two additional tracks.
E.  Re-issue of I'm No J.D. with alternate track listing.
F.  Re-issue of Rockin' and Shakin' .

G.  Re-issue of Come on Memphis! with alternate track listing.
H.  Re-issue of Take One! with two recent B-sides replacing two of the original tracks.
I.  A re-recorded version of the 1970 single.
J.  Credited to Shakin' Stevens and Bonnie Tyler.
K.  Released as "Stuck on Elvis" in Australia and New Zealand
L.  Credited to Shaky and Roger Taylor.
M:  Filmed at Knebworth House, Hertfordshire

References

External links
 Official Website
 Shakin' Stevens at AllMusic
 

Stevens, Shakin'
Rock music discographies